Guane Municipal Museum is a museum located in Isabel Rubio street in Guane, Cuba. It was established as a museum on 14 December 1979.

It holds sections on history, archeology, numismatics, weaponry and ethnology.

See also 
 List of museums in Cuba

References 

Museums in Cuba
Buildings and structures in Pinar del Río Province
Museums established in 1979
1979 establishments in Cuba
20th-century architecture in Cuba